The  is a Japanese translation of the Christian Bible, completed in 1987, and is currently the most widely used Japanese Bible, by both Catholics and Protestants.

Joint ecumenical effort
In accordance with the ecumenical movement of the latter half of the 20th century, a joint ecumenical translation committee was set up in 1969 to get a new translation of the Bible, so it can be used by all Christian denominations.

Interconfessional Translation Bible
However, for example, its local pronunciation rule of the people and place names, such as "Yesusu" (Jesus) and "Paurosu" (Paul), when used in worship, created some confusions and problems.

New Interconfessional Translation Bible
The committee, therefore, made necessary adjustments, such as "Yesu" (Jesus) and "Pauro" (Paul), and continued the translation work. In 1987, both Old and New Testaments were published as the New Interconfessional Translation Bible.

Original Bible texts
It is a complete Bible translation, of the Old and New Testaments and the Deuterocanonical books. The original texts used are: Biblia Hebraica Stuttgartensia in Hebrew for the Old Testament, Nestle-Åland Novum Testamentum Graece in Greek, and the Greek Old Testament for the Deuterocanonical books.

Publication
Its publication is done by Japan Bible Society (日本聖書協会), a member of the United Bible Societies (UBS). It is published in various forms, such as the whole Old and New Testament book, Old Testament only book, New Testament only book, Old Testament with or without the Deuterocanonical books, Japanese translation with the English translation (Good News Bible (TEV) or New International Version (NIV)), with the Korean translation, etc.

Use in churches
It is now the most widely read Japanese Bible, by both Catholics and Protestants. It is used by Catholic churches, Anglican/Episcopal churches, Lutheran churches, United Church of Christ churches and other churches. It is not used by the Japanese Orthodox Church because they, although participated in the translation committee initially, later backed out and did not approve its use in the church.

The , first published in 1955, is Japan's first effort to translate the Bible in compliance with the modern Japanese writing system that went into effect right after World War II and is now much less used.

2018 Revision
The aim of the revision was to create a Bible with "prestigious and beautiful Japanese that is suitable for reading in worship services" and to correct issues that had arisen due to the use of both dynamic and formal equivalence translation methods.

See also
 Bible translations
 Bible translations into Japanese
 Christianity in Japan
 Catholic Church in Japan

References

External links
 A Brief History of Japanese Bible Translation (in Japan Bible Society web)

1987 books
1987 in Christianity
Christianity in Japan